Lam Tsuen Valley is situated in the New Territories, Hong Kong, west of Tai Po New Town. Lam Tsuen and other villages are located in the valley. The Lam Tsuen River and its branches collect water from nearby hills. The area is suitable for cultivation, though fewer and fewer residents still participate in the agricultural sector.

Features
 Kadoorie Farm
 Lam Tsuen wishing trees

Valleys of Hong Kong
Lam Tsuen